Derrick Prentice Barry (born July 18, 1983) is an American drag performer, Britney Spears impersonator and reality television personality. He is best known for competing on the third season of America's Got Talent (2008), and later the eighth season of RuPaul's Drag Race (2016) and fifth season of RuPaul's Drag Race All Stars (2020).

Early life 
Barry, born July 18, 1983 to Laura Lee Everitt and Scott Prentice Barry, was raised in Modesto, California. He first saw Britney Spears when he was 15 in her "...Baby One More Time" music video on MTV, and first went to see her in concert in 2002. His first time in drag was when he dressed as Spears for Halloween in 2003. His second time dressing as Spears was two weeks later on November 17, 2003, at the audience of The Tonight Show where Spears was a guest star. Derrick was the 2010 representative for a National anti-bullying organization Don't H8 as Miss Don't H8 DIVA where she was also awarded Hall of Fame, LEGEND Award, Lifetime Achievement Award, and Presidential Hall of Champions.

Career 

Barry first gained attention when he competed on the third season of America's Got Talent in 2008, with his talent being a Britney impersonator. He made it past the auditions, but was eliminated in the quarterfinals. After the show, he appeared in the music videos for Eminem's "We Made You" and Katy Perry's "Waking Up in Vegas" in 2009. He was brought on stage by Madonna during one of her performances on her Rebel Heart Tour in 2015.

It was announced that Barry would be competing with 11 other drag queens for the eighth season of RuPaul's Drag Race on February 1, 2016. He was the one-hundredth queen to be seen competing on the show in the first episode. He was eliminated in the eighth episode after losing a lip sync to Bob the Drag Queen, and placing fifth.

In acting, he first appeared as the character Julie in an episode of Dig in 2015. He appeared in Sharknado: The 4th Awakens in 2016. He played the character Kimberly in War on Everyone in 2016.

She appeared as a guest for the first challenge in the premiere of season eleven of Drag Race. She appeared with Vanessa Vanjie Mateo and Silky Nutmeg Ganache for an episode of the fourteenth season of Germany's Next Topmodel in 2019.

In September 2019, at RuPaul’s DragCon NYC, Barry was named as one of a rotating cast of a dozen Drag Race queens in RuPaul's Drag Race Live!, a Las Vegas show residency from January to August 2020 at the  Flamingo Las Vegas. The show will feature RuPaul's music and seven of the 12 queens: Barry, Aquaria (winner of season ten), Asia O'Hara (season ten), Coco Montrese (season five, All Stars season two), Yvie Oddly (winner of season eleven), Eureka O'Hara (seasons nine and ten, All Stars season six), India Ferrah (season three, All Stars season five), Kahanna Montrese (season eleven), Kameron Michaels (season ten), Kim Chi (season eight), Naomi Smalls (season eight, All Stars season four), and Shannel (season one, All Stars one). Barry had prior experience working in Vegas drag shows, being a part Frank Marino's Divas Las Vegas and starring in Drag Queen Cuisine at House of Blues. In March 2022, Barry, alongside the rest of the RuPaul's Drag Race Live! cast, performed with Katy Perry during her Play concert residency at Resorts World Las Vegas.

Barry joined Eve in her performance of Supermodel by RuPaul during her appearance on The Talk.

In 2020, Barry returned for the fifth season of RuPaul's Drag Race All Stars, where she was the first queen eliminated from the competition, placing 10th overall.

In June 2021, she was a featured performer at Nashville's OUTLOUD Music Festival.

Music 
Barry released his first single, "BOOMBOOM" with Chris Cox on May 6, 2016.

Personal life 
As of January 2017, Barry is in a polyamorous relationship with Nick San Pedro and Mackenzie Claude, a fellow drag queen who goes by the name Nebraska Thunderfuck, a drag daughter of Alaska Thunderfuck.

In 2017, Barry generated controversy when he mistakenly stated in a Billboard round table discussion that people were killed during the Stonewall Riots; Willam Belli, also present at the discussion, corrected him. Willam later based her song "Derrick" on the incident. Barry appeared in the music video for "Derrick".

Filmography

Movies

Television

Web series

Music videos

Discography

Singles

References

External links
 

1983 births
Living people
American drag queens
America's Got Talent contestants
American gay actors
Gay entertainers
American LGBT musicians
LGBT people from California
LGBT people from Nevada
American LGBT rights activists
People from Modesto, California
Polyamorous people
Derrick Barry
Derrick Barry